Madison County is a county in the U.S. state of Montana. As of the 2020 census, the population was 8,623. Its county seat is Virginia City. The county was founded in 1865; at the time it was part of the Montana Territory.

Geography

Major highways

  Interstate 15
  Former U.S. Highway 91
  U.S. Highway 287
  Montana Highway 41
  Montana Highway 84
  Montana Highway 87
  Montana Highway 55
  Montana Highway 287

Adjacent counties

 Beaverhead County - southwest
 Silver Bow County - northwest
 Jefferson County - north
 Gallatin County - east
 Fremont County, Idaho - south

National protected areas
 Beaverhead National Forest (part)
 Deerlodge National Forest (part)
 Gallatin National Forest (part)

Politics
In presidential elections, Madison County has historically voted predominantly Republican, with Franklin D. Roosevelt the only Democrat to carry the vote since 1916, the last of the three times he did so being in 1940.

Demographics

2000 census
As of the 2000 United States census, there were 6,851 people, 2,956 households, and 1,921 families in the county. The population density was 2 people per square mile (1/km2). There were 4,671 housing units at an average density of 1 per square mile (0/km2). The racial makeup of the county was 97.02% White, 0.04% Black or African American, 0.53% Native American, 0.26% Asian, 0.76% from other races, and 1.39% from two or more races. 1.90% of the population were Hispanic or Latino of any race. 21.6% were of German, 16.4% English, 11.0% Irish, 7.8% American and 7.3% Norwegian ancestry.

There were 2,956 households, out of which 26.10% had children under the age of 18 living with them, 57.80% were married couples living together, 4.40% had a female householder with no husband present, and 35.00% were non-families. 29.30% of all households were made up of individuals, and 10.90% had someone living alone who was 65 years of age or older. The average household size was 2.29 and the average family size was 2.85.

The county population contained 22.90% under the age of 18, 4.90% from 18 to 24, 25.00% from 25 to 44, 30.10% from 45 to 64, and 17.20% who were 65 years of age or older. The median age was 43 years. For every 100 females there were 102.30 males. For every 100 females age 18 and over, there were 103.90 males.

The median income for a household in the county was $30,233, and the median income for a family was $35,536. Males had a median income of $26,606 versus $17,917 for females. The per capita income for the county was $16,944. About 10.20% of families and 12.10% of the population were below the poverty line, including 14.20% of those under age 18 and 9.30% of those age 65 or over.

2010 census
As of the 2010 United States census, there were 7,691 people, 3,560 households, and 2,192 families residing in the county. The racial makeup of the county was 96.8% white, 0.5% American Indian, 0.3% Asian, 0.2% black or African American, 0.8% from other races, and 1.4% from two or more races. Those of Hispanic or Latino origin made up 2.4% of the population. In terms of ancestry, 31.0% were German, 19.7% were English, 18.9% were Irish, 7.3% were Norwegian, 5.9% were Swedish, 5.0% were Scottish, and 2.9% were American.

Of the 3,560 households, 21.1% had children under the age of 18 living with them, 53.9% were married couples living together, 4.5% had a female householder with no husband present, 38.4% were non-families, and 32.6% of all households were made up of individuals. The average household size was 2.11 and the average family size was 2.67. The median age was 49.8 years.

The median income for a household in the county was $42,998 and the median income for a family was $52,636. Males had a median income of $38,495 versus $28,125 for females. The per capita income for the county was $32,205. About 8.5% of families and 11.6% of the population were below the poverty line, including 16.7% of those under age 18 and 9.8% of those age 65 or over.

Communities

Towns

 Ennis
 Sheridan
 Twin Bridges
 Virginia City

Census-designated places

 Alder
 Big Sky
 Brandon
 Harrison
 Jeffers
 Mammoth
 McAllister
 Norris
 Pony
 Silver Star

Other unincorporated communities

 Cameron
 Jefferson Island
 Junction
 Laurin
 Nevada City
 Red Bluff
 Rochester
 Ruby
 Sterling
 Summit

Former communities
 Union City

Notable person
 Sam V. Stewart, former Montana governor and Supreme Court justice

See also
 List of lakes in Madison County, Montana
 List of mountains in Madison County, Montana
 National Register of Historic Places listings in Madison County, Montana

References

External links
 Montana Association of Counties - Madison County website

 
1865 establishments in Montana Territory
Populated places established in 1865